Simon Chan is a Singaporean Chinese Christian theologian and ordained minister of the Assemblies of God.

Biography 
Chan received his M.Div. from Asian Theological Seminary and his MTheol in Systematic Theology from South East Asia Graduate School of Theology. He then completed his Ph.D. in Historical Theology from Cambridge University

Until 2016, Chan was the Earnest Lau Professor of Systematic Theology and Dean of Studies at Trinity Theological College, Singapore. From 1997 to 2013, he edited the seminary's Trinity Theological Journal. Since 2016, he has been the editor of the Asian Journal of Theology.

Works

References

Year of birth missing (living people)
Living people
Theologians
20th-century Protestant theologians
21st-century Protestant theologians
Alumni of the University of Cambridge